Beef Wellington is a steak dish of English origin, made out of fillet steak coated with pâté (often pâté de foie gras) and duxelles, wrapped in puff pastry, then baked. Some recipes include wrapping the coated meat in a crêpe or parma ham to retain the moisture and prevent it from making the pastry soggy.

A whole tenderloin may be wrapped and baked, and then sliced for serving, or the tenderloin may be sliced into individual portions prior to wrapping and baking.

Naming
While historians generally believe that the dish is named after Arthur Wellesley, 1st Duke of Wellington, the precise origin of the name is unclear and no definite connection between the dish and the duke has been found.

Leah Hyslop, writing in The Daily Telegraph, observed that by the time Wellington became famous, meat baked in pastry was a well-established part of English cuisine, and that the dish's similarity to the French filet de bœuf en croûte (fillet of beef in pastry) might imply that "Beef Wellington" was a "timely patriotic rebranding of a trendy continental dish". However, she cautioned, there are no 19th-century recipes for the dish. There is a mention of "fillet of beef, a la Wellington" in the Los Angeles Times of 1903, and an 1899 reference in a menu from the Hamburg-America line. It may be related to 'steig' or steak Wellington, an Irish dish (the Duke was from an Anglo-Irish family), but the dates for this are unclear.

In the Polish classic cookbook, finished in 1909 and published for the first time in 1910, by Maria Ochorowicz-Monatowa (1866-1925), Uniwersalna książka kucharska ("The Universal Cooking Book"), there is a recipe for "Polędwica wołowa à la Wellington" (beef fillet à la Wellington). The recipe does not differ from the dish later known under this name. It is a beef filet enveloped together with duxelles in puff pastry, baked, and served with a truffle or Madeira sauce. The author, who mastered her cooking skills both in Paris and Vienna at the end of the 19th century, claimed that she had received this recipe from the cook of the imperial court in Vienna. She also included "filet à la Wellington" in the menus proposed for the "exquisite dinners".

In Le Répertoire de la Cuisine a professional reference cookbook published by Théodore Gringoire and Louis Saulnier in 1914, there is mentioned a garnish "Wellington" to beef, described as: "Fillet browned in butter and in the oven, coated in poultry stuffing with dry duxelles added, placed in rolled-out puff pastry. Cooked in the oven. Garnished with peeled tomatoes,lettuce, Pommes château".

An installment of a serialized story entitled "Custom Built" by Sidney Herschel Small in 1930 had two of its characters in a restaurant in Los Angeles that had "beef Wellington" on its menu. The first occurrence of the dish recorded in the Oxford English Dictionary is a quotation from a 1939 New York food guide with "Tenderloin of Beef Wellington" which is cooked, left to cool, and rolled in a pie crust.

Variations
In the Food Network show Good Eats, Alton Brown discusses a variant using the cheaper pork tenderloin instead of beef. Similar dishes of different types of protein baked in pastry include sausage and salmon. Various Wellington recipes using vegetables, such as mushrooms and beet Wellingtons, also exist.

See also
 Shooter's sandwich
 List of beef dishes
 List of steak dishes

References

Baked foods
Beef dishes
English beef dishes